Torloisk House (sometimes referred to as Torluck House in 19th century references) on the Isle of Mull, Argyll in Scotland was the family seat held by the Macleans of Torloisk. The house is protected as a category B listed building.

History of Torloisk House
In April 1588 Jonet Campbell was married at Torloisk and her son Lachlan Mor Maclean used the opportunity to revenge himself on his new stepfather John MacKane and some of the wedding guests.

Torloisk House (and Torloisk Estate) as they now exist are the result of alterations and additions made under the ownership of Admiral William Compton, 4th Marquess of Northampton.

Pyromania at Torloisk House
There was an unusual case of pyromania at Torloisk House in the year 1848.

References

External links
Mull, Torloisk House | ScotlandsPlaces
Torloisk House, Isle of Mull Holiday Accommodation

Buildings and structures on the Isle of Mull
Buildings and structures in Argyll and Bute
Houses in Argyll and Bute
Category B listed buildings in Argyll and Bute
Listed houses in Scotland